Albert Zweifel (born 7 June 1949) is a Swiss former professional cyclo-cross cyclist. Zweifel competed as a professional from 1973 to 1989, winning the UCI Cyclo-cross World Championships five times (1976, 1977, 1978, 1979, 1986). He was also the Swiss National Cyclo-cross Champion nine times. Zweifel dominated cyclo-cross in Switzerland in the 1970s as well as winning big international cyclo-cross races such as Aigle and Igorre.

He also competed in road races, having ridden in the 1981 Tour de France and the 1974 Giro d'Italia. He also finished in the top 10 overall four times in the Tour de Suisse.

References

External links

1949 births
Living people
Swiss male cyclists
Cyclo-cross cyclists
People from Hinwil District
UCI Cyclo-cross World Champions (men)
Rüti, Zürich
Sportspeople from the canton of Zürich